The Aso-class patrol vessel is a class of PL type patrol vessel of the Japan Coast Guard. PL stands for Patrol vessel Large, and the class is named after Mount Aso, the largest active volcano in Japan.

This class is one of the new patrol vessel classes to intercept spy boats of DPRK. These classes are called "高速高機能大型巡視船", High-speed, high-functionality patrol vessel, large. Having Bofors 40 mm L/70 autocannon with fire-control system, this class is safely able to deal with heavily armed spy boats of DPRK which intrude into Japanese waters. The hull of this class is bulletproof in case of close-range firefights.

In the back of the bridge's side, this class has display devices that can be used to instruct other ships to stop even at nighttime. And on the bridge superstructure, this class is equipped with the LIDAR system to acquire targets with high accuracy. At the same time, this system enables them to perform search and rescue missions more safely.

In 2020 there was signed an export deal between Japan and Vietnam over 6 vessel for the Vietnam Coast Guard (VCG), locally designated as the "TT-1500 patrol ship"."TT" stands for "Tuần tra" means "Patrol", meanwhile the number "1500" stands for the class's displacement of 1500 tons. According to pieces of information shared by VCG, TT-1500 has a slightly bigger size than the original Aso-class, and it is also equipped with a helipad and the overall design is likely inspired from the successor designs such as the Kunigami-class patrol vessel.

Ships in the class

See also
 List of Japan Coast Guard vessels and aircraft
  - another class of High-speed, high-functionality patrol vessel, large.

References

Further reading
 
 
 

Patrol vessels of the Japan Coast Guard
Patrol ship classes